Carel Dekker (born 22 July 1934) is a Dutch field hockey player. He competed in the men's tournament at the 1960 Summer Olympics.

References

External links
 

1934 births
Living people
Dutch male field hockey players
Olympic field hockey players of the Netherlands
Field hockey players at the 1960 Summer Olympics
Sportspeople from Zaanstad